Bretton Richardson is an American baseball coach and former catcher, who is the a current assistant coach for the Florida A&M Rattlers. He played college baseball at Florida A&M. Richardson then served as the head coach of the Florida A&M Rattlers (2011) and the Alcorn State Braves (2016–2021).

Early life
Richardson attended Lincoln High School in Tallahassee, Florida. Richardson then accepted a scholarship to attend Florida A&M University. He caught for the Rattlers, who won the Mid-Eastern Athletic Conference (MEAC) in 1990, 1991 & 1992.

Coaching career
Richardson spent four seasons as an assistant baseball coach at Lincoln High School. In 1998, he joined the Florida A&M staff as a graduate assistant. In 2000, he was promoted to a full-time assistant for the Rattlers.

On May 17, 2010, Florida A&M fired head coach Robert Lucas and placed Richardson in charge of the day-to-day operations. On September 16, 2010, Richardson was named the interim head coach of the Florida A&M Rattlers. He led the Rattlers to a 17–40 record and a return to the MEAC Tournament.

On August 19, 2015, Richardson was named the head baseball coach at Alcorn State University.

Head coaching record

References

External links
Bretton Richardson at The Baseball Cube
Florida A&M Rattlers bio
Alcorn State Braves bio

Living people
Florida A&M Rattlers baseball players
High school baseball coaches in the United States
Florida A&M Rattlers baseball coaches
Alcorn State Braves baseball coaches
Year of birth missing (living people)
Sportspeople from Tallahassee, Florida
Baseball coaches from Florida
African-American baseball coaches